Sir Thomas Scott (1535 – 30 December 1594), of Scot's Hall in Kent, was an English Member of Parliament (MP).

Family
Thomas Scott was the eldest son of Sir Reginald Scott, a member of one of the leading families in Kent, by his first wife, Emeline Kempe, the daughter of Sir William Kempe of Ollantigh and Eleanor Browne, daughter of Sir Robert Browne.

Career
Scott quickly became prominent in public affairs. He was knighted in 1571, served as MP for Kent in the parliaments of 1571 and 1586–7, and was High Sheriff in 1576. He was also a Deputy Lieutenant, a commissioner for draining and improving Romney Marsh, and was in charge of the improvement of Dover harbour.

In Parliament, Scott seems to have been a consistent scourge of the Roman Catholics. In his first Parliament, he was appointed to a joint committee with the House of Lords to confer with the Royal lawyers on how to deal with Mary, Queen of Scots. On 15 May 1572, in the debate following the committee's report to the Commons, he regaled the House with his conclusion, that the Scots Queen was not the root of the mischief: "Rather, as a good physician before prescribing medicine, he would seek out the causes. Papistry was the principal." The second cause was the uncertainty of the succession, and the medicine he prescribed was threefold - taking away Mary's title to the succession, establishing an alternative heir and, as these two alone would be insufficient, cutting off the heads of the Scots Queen and the Duke of Alva. Scott's drastic advice was echoed by many others in the debate, but was not adopted by the government.

In February 1587, Scott was warning Parliament of the danger from Spain. (His second son, John, was serving with the army in the Netherlands, and was soon to win a knighthood for his services. ) He told the Commons that in his view there was "more danger by advancing Papists into place of trust and government than by anything", advice which no doubt went down well with the mood of the day, but also considered the dangers of invasion, drawing from the resistance to Julius Caesar the lesson that the enemy should be countered at sea or fought while landing on the beaches. His attack on the Catholics caught the imagination of the Puritan members, and he was forthwith appointed to the head of a small committee "to search certain houses in Westminster suspected of receiving and harbouring of Jesuits, seminaries or of seditious and Popish books and trumperies of superstition." But he did not neglect his own advice on more practical military defences: at the time of the Spanish Armada the following year, he was appointed head of the defensive force assembled to meet any invasion in Kent, and equipped four thousand men at his own expense within a day of receiving his orders.

The esteem in which he was held was demonstrated after his death in 1594 by an offer from the parish of Ashford to bury him in the parish church free of charge, although his heirs declined the offer and he was buried at Brabourne.

Marriages and issue

Scott married firstly Elizabeth Baker (d. 17 November 1583), the daughter of Sir John Baker of Sissinghurst and sister-in-law of Thomas Sackville, 1st Earl of Dorset, by whom he had ten sons and four daughters:

Sir Edward Scott.
Thomas Scott, esquire.
Sir John Scott of Nettlestead, Kent, who married, as his second wife, Katherine Smythe, widow of Sir Rowland Hayward and daughter of Thomas Smythe, Customer of London. He was a Member of Parliament for Kent and an early investor in the Colony of Virginia.
Richard Scott, who married Katherine Hayward, daughter of Sir Rowland Hayward.
Robert Scott.
Reginald Scott.
Sir William Scott.
Joseph Scott.
Anthony Scott.
Benjamin Scott.
Elizabeth Scott, who married firstly John Knatchbull, and secondly, in 1589, Sir Richard Smythe (d.1628), the son of Thomas Smythe, Customer of London.
Emeline Scott, who married Sir Robert Edolphe.
Anne Scott, who married firstly Richard Knatchbull, and secondly Sir Henry Bromley.
Mary Scott, who married Sir Anthony St. Leger (d.1603), of Ulcombe and Leeds, Kent, eldest son and heir of Sir Warham St Leger by his first wife, Ursula Neville, youngest daughter of George Neville, 5th Baron Bergavenny, by whom she was the mother of Sir Warham St Leger (d. 11 October 1631), who married Mary Hayward (d.1662), daughter of Sir Rowland Hayward. After the death of Sir Anthony St. Leger in 1603, his widow, Mary Scott, married Sir Alexander Culpeper (d. 15 April 1636) of Wigsell, East Sussex.

He married secondly Elizabeth Heyman (d.1595), the daughter of Ralph Heyman of Somerfield, by whom he had no issue.

He married thirdly Dorothy Bere, the daughter of John Bere of Horsman's Place, Dartford, by whom he had no issue.

Notes

References

 

 

1535 births
1594 deaths
People from the Borough of Ashford
English knights
High Sheriffs of Kent
English MPs 1571
English MPs 1586–1587